Andrea de Franchis (died 1603) was a Roman Catholic prelate who served as Archbishop of Trani (1598–1603).

Biography
On 4 Aug 1598, he was appointed during the papacy of Pope Clement VIII as Archbishop of Trani.
He served as Archbishop of Trani until his death in 1603.

References

External links and additional sources
 (for Chronology of Bishops) 
 (for Chronology of Bishops)  

16th-century Roman Catholic archbishops in the Kingdom of Naples
17th-century Roman Catholic archbishops in the Kingdom of Naples
Bishops appointed by Pope Clement VIII
1603 deaths